Reidun Tatham (born March 20, 1978) is a Canadian retired synchronized swimmer and Olympic medalist.

Born in Calgary, Alberta, Tatham participated on the Canadian team that received a bronze medal in synchronized team at the 2000 Summer Olympics in Sydney, Australia.

She later changed careers and is currently employed as Senior Natural Gas Trader at Macquarie Energy Canada Ltd. in Calgary, Alberta.

External links
Olympic Info

1978 births
Living people
Canadian synchronized swimmers
Olympic bronze medalists for Canada
Olympic medalists in synchronized swimming
Olympic synchronized swimmers of Canada
Swimmers from Calgary
Synchronized swimmers at the 2000 Summer Olympics
Medalists at the 2000 Summer Olympics
Pan American Games medalists in synchronized swimming
Synchronized swimmers at the 1999 Pan American Games
Pan American Games gold medalists for Canada
Medalists at the 1999 Pan American Games
20th-century Canadian women
21st-century Canadian women